The Westbury Shales is a geologic formation in England. It preserves fossils of Holcoptera schlotheimi, Saurichthys acuminatus, Coleopteron sp. and Liassophlebia sp. dating back to the Rhaetian period.

See also 
 List of fossiliferous stratigraphic units in England

References

Further reading 
 R. S. Kelly, A. J. Ross, and P. Davidson. 2017. Mesozoic Holcoptera (Coleoptera: Coptoclavidae) from England and the United States. Proceedings of the Geologists' Association 128:659-674
 R. J. G. Savage and N. F. Large. 1966. On Birgeria acuminata and the absence of labyrinthodonts from the Rhaetic. Palaeontology 9(1):135-141
 R. J. Tillyard. 1925. The British Liassic Dragonflies. Fossil Insects, British Museum Natural History 1:1-40

Geologic formations of England
Triassic System of Europe
Triassic England
Rhaetian Stage
Shale formations
Paleontology in England